Black Reign  is an EP by American heavy metal band Avenged Sevenfold, released on September 21, 2018, through Warner Bros. Records. It is a compilation of all their original songs created for the Call of Duty: Black Ops series from 2011 to 2018.

Background 
In September 2018 it was announced the band would release all previous non-album collaborations with the Call of Duty: Black Ops video game series in one collected EP, including a brand new single made specifically for Black Ops 4 as well as "Jade Helm", which was previously only available in-game on Black Ops III.

On September 23, 2018, M. Shadows took to Avenged Sevenfold's Reddit to address the criticism regarding the mixing of "Mad Hatter". He subsequently published a second version to download for free and explained that the song would be replaced on all radio stations and streaming websites.

Musical style
M. Shadows spoke to Kerrang! about the EP saying "We felt that we should go for something bigger, darker and more cerebral" referring to the brand new song "Mad Hatter". He continued "We have a very deep relationship with the team at Treyarch. We're proud to be part of the family and extremely excited for people to enjoy this next chapter and our contribution to it."

Track listing

Personnel
M. Shadows – lead vocals
Synyster Gates – lead guitar, backing vocals
Zacky Vengeance – rhythm guitar, backing vocals
Johnny Christ – bass, gang vocals
Arin Ilejay – drums on "Carry On" and "Not Ready to Die"
Brooks Wackerman – drums on "Mad Hatter" and "Jade Helm"

References

Avenged Sevenfold albums
Heavy metal EPs
2018 EPs